Wallach v Lew Geffen Estates CC is an important case in South African law, heard in the Appellate Division. The judges were Hoexter JA, Milne JA, Grosskopf JA, Goldstone JA and Howie AJA. An appeal from a decision in the Witwatersrand Local Division by Lazarus J, the case was heard on March 22, 1993, with judgment handed down on March 25. The court found that there is no obligation on a person to whom a cheque has been given to present the cheque on the day on which it was received. The court also held that it is open to Court at a motion or application hearing to hold that it is unnecessary to hear oral evidence and decide matter on the papers. Such a course would be justified where the hearing of oral evidence would not and could not have affected the outcome of the claim for substantive relief, and would have caused unnecessary costs and delay.

Judgment 
Milne JA held—and Hoexter JA, F H Grosskopf JA, Goldstone JA and Howie AJA concurred—that there is no obligation on a person to whom a cheque has been given to present the cheque on the day on which it was received.

The court also found that, where, in an application on notice of motion, an order has been made referring the application for the hearing of oral evidence (such an order amounting to a non-appealable ruling), it is open to the court, when the matter comes before it for such hearing of oral evidence, to hold that it is unnecessary to hear oral evidence and to decide the matter on the papers.

In an appeal from an order in a Local Division (decided on the papers in an application on notice of motion after the Local Division had held that it was unnecessary to hear oral evidence, notwithstanding the fact that the matter had earlier been referred by the court for the hearing of oral evidence), the court held that there had been weighty considerations justifying the decision not to hear evidence: namely, that the hearing of oral evidence would not and could not have affected the outcome of the claim for substantive relief, and would have caused unnecessary costs to have been incurred and have involved unnecessary delay.

The decision in the Witwatersrand Local Division, in Lew Geffen Estates CC v Wallach, was thus confirmed.

See also 
 Civil procedure in South Africa
 Law of South Africa

References

Cases 
 Bell v Bell 1908 TS 887.
 Dickinson and Another v Fisher's Executors 1914 AD 424.
 Duncan NO v Minister of Law and Order 1985 (4) SA 1 (T).
 Engar and Others v Omar Salem Essa Trust 1969 (2) SA 423 (D).
 Engar and Others v Omar Salem Essa Trust 1970 (1) SA 77 (N).
 Feinstein v Niggli and Another 1981 (2) SA 684 (A).
 Firestone South Africa (Pty) Ltd v Gentiruco AG 1977 (4) SA 298 (A).
 Globe & Phoenix Gold Mining Co Ltd v Rhodesian Corporation Ltd 1932 AD 146.
 Kalil v Decotex (Pty) Ltd and Another 1988 (1) SA 943 (A).
 Klep Valves (Pty) Ltd v Saunders Valve Co Ltd 1987 (2) SA 1 (A).
 Mahomed v Malk 1930 TPD 615.
 Mans v Union Meat Co 1919 AD 268.
 Marques v Trust Bank of Africa Ltd and Another 1988 (2) SA 526 (W).
 Meyers v Braudo 1927 TPD 393.
 National and Overseas Distributors Corporation (Pty) Ltd v Potato Board 1958 (2) SA 473 (A).
 Orban v Stead and Another 1978 (2) SA 713 (W).
 Pfizer Inc v SA Druggists Ltd (1986) XI Burrells Patent Law Reports 713.
 Pfizer Inc v SA Druggists Ltd (1987) XII Burrells Patent Law Reports 368.
 Pfizer Inc v South African Druggists Ltd 1987 (1) SA 259 (T).
 Pretoria Garrison Institutes v Danish Variety Products (Pty) Ltd 1948 (1) SA 839 (A).
 R Bakers (Pty) Ltd v Ruto Bakeries (Pty) Ltd 1948 (2) SA 626 (T).
 Ranch International Pipelines (Transvaal) (Pty) Ltd v LMG Construction (City) (Pty) Ltd; LMG Construction (City) (Pty) Ltd v Ranch International Pipelines (Transvaal) (Pty) Ltd and Others 1984 (3) SA 861 (W).
 South Cape Corporation (Pty) Ltd v Engineering Management Services (Pty) Ltd 1977 (3) SA 534 (A).
 Tomkin (Pty) Ltd v Bauer 1931 TPD 292.
 Trust Bank van Afrika Bpk v Western Bank Bpk en Andere NNO 1978 (4) SA 281 (A).
 Union Government (Minister of the Interior) and Registrar of Asiatics v Naidoo 1916 AD 50.
 Van Streepen & Germs (Pty) Ltd v Transvaal Provincial Administration 1987 (4) SA 569 (A).
 Zweni v Minister of Law and Order 1993 (1) SA 523 (A).

Notes 

1993 in South African law
1993 in case law
Appellate Division (South Africa) cases